Tuomo Mannermaa (Oulu, Finland, 29 September 1937 – Espoo, 19 January 2015) was professor emeritus of ecumenical theology at University of Helsinki. He is known especially for his theological criticism of the Leuenberg Concord and his research on the relationship between justification and theosis in the theology of Martin Luther. His initiating and furthering this research caused him to be regarded as the father of "The New Finnish Interpretation of Luther" or "the Finnish School of Tuomo Mannermaa".

Finnish School
Mannermaa led the development of "The New Finnish Interpretation of Luther" that presents Luther's views on salvation in terms much closer to the Eastern Orthodox doctrine of theosis rather than established interpretations of German Luther scholarship. This research has recently been presented in English in an anthology of papers edited by Carl E. Braaten and Robert W. Jenson in a work entitled, Union with Christ: The New Finnish Interpretation of Luther. Mannermaa states, "the external impulse for this new wave of Luther studies in Helsinki came surprisingly from outside the boundaries of Luther research. It came from the ecumenical dialogue between the Evangelical Lutheran Church of Finland and the Russian Orthodox Church that was initiated by Archbishop Martti Simojoki at the beginning of the nineteen-seventies."

The New Finnish Interpretation has been challenged because it downplays Luther's roots in key theological developments in Western Christendom, and it characterizes Luther's teaching on Justification as based on Jesus's righteousness which indwells the believer rather than Jesus's righteousness as imputed to the believer.

Selected works
Von Preussen nach Leuenberg: Hintergrund und Entwicklung der theologischen Methode der Leuenberger Konkordie. Lutherisches Verlagshaus, 1981 
Christ Present in Faith: Luther's View of Justification. Fortress Press, 2005

References

External links
 Rethinking Justification. A Review of Christ Present in Faith: Luther's View of Justification by Tuomo Mannermaa Developing Theology * Mannermaa, Tuomo. "The Doctrine of Justification and Christology Chapter A, Section One of The Christ Present in Faith". Concordia Theological Quarterly 64 (2000)

1937 births
2015 deaths
People from Oulu
Finnish Lutheran theologians
Academic staff of the University of Helsinki
20th-century Protestant theologians
20th-century Lutherans
20th-century Lutheran theologians
21st-century Lutheran theologians